The Kuvayı Milliye Derneği (National Forces Society) is a racist ultra-nationalist organization based in Mersin, Turkey. It was founded on 11 November 2005 by retired Turkish army colonel Fikri Karadağ.

References

2005 establishments in Turkey
Far-right politics in Turkey
Organizations based in Mersin
Nationalist organizations
Racism in Turkey